S Microscopii is a star in the constellation Microscopium. It is a red giant star of spectral type M3e-M5.5 that is also a Mira variable, with an apparent magnitude ranging between 7.4 and 14.8 over 210 days. The Astronomical Society of Southern Africa in 2003 reported that observations of S Microscopii were very urgently needed as data on its light curve was incomplete.

References

Microscopium
M-type giants
Mira variables
Microscopii, S
Durchmusterung objects
204045
102096
Emission-line stars